St. James High School (SJHS) is a public high school in Murrells Inlet, South Carolina, United States, located west of Highway 17 on Highway 707 approximately six miles from the Atlantic Ocean. It is one of 13 high schools in the Horry County School District. St. James has over 1,700 students and is the home of the St. James High School Sharks. St. James Elementary, Burgess Elementary, Seaside Elementary, St. James Intermediate, and St. James Middle School feed into St. James High.

History 
Due to the rapid growth in the south beach area and overcrowding at Socastee High School, Horry County Schools began planning the construction of a new high school in the Burgess community in 2002. Although the county wanted to name the new school South Strand High School, the decision was ultimately left up to a committee formed by local students and parents to select the school's name, mascot, and colors. The name St. James High School was chosen, and the school opened to students in 2003. St. James opened with 700 students, which did not include a senior class.

In 2016, St. James won the prestigious Palmetto Finest School Award.

Campus 
The high school has eight computer labs, a media center with over 14,000 books, a 682-seat auditorium, gymnasium, mini gym, and a weight room. Its athletic facilities include three lighted practice fields, a 5,000 seat football/soccer stadium surrounded by an eight-lane track, a softball field, baseball field, four tennis courts, and an on-campus cross country course. Additionally, the boys' golf team plays at Wicked Stick Golf Links in Myrtle Beach, South Carolina, the girls' golf team plays at Blackmoor Golf Club in Murrells Inlet, South Carolina, and the swim team meets at Coastal Carolina University.

Academics 
St. James offers 19 Advanced Placement classes along with  Horry-Georgetown Technical College. The St. James Fine Arts Department consists of The Pride of St. James marching band, chorus, orchestra, art, and drama. The English Department produces the Shark Attack school newspaper and the Echoes yearbook. A JROTC program was also implemented in 2010, with about 200 cadets annually.

Athletics 
St. James offers 11 fall sports, seven winter sports, 13 spring sports, and five annual sports.
 Fall sports: B-team, JV, and varsity football, JV and varsity volleyball, boys' and girls' cross country, girls' golf, girls' tennis, and girls' and boys' swimming.
 Winter sports: wrestling, B-team, JV, and varsity boys' basketball, and B-team, JV, and varsity girls' basketball.
 Spring sports: JV and varsity baseball,  JV and varsity softball, boys' tennis, boys' and girls' track and field, boys' JV and varsity golf, JV and varsity boys' soccer, JV and varsity girls' soccer, JV and Varsity boys' lacrosse, JV and Varsity girls' lacrosse.
 Year-round sports: B-team, JV and varsity cheerleading, Sharkies dance team, and step team.
State championships
 2006–2007: Girls Softball AAA State Champions
 2008–2009: Boys 4x400 Meter Relay AAA State Champions
 2008–2009: Boys 400 Meter Dash AAA State Champion
 2010–2011: Boys Baseball AAA State Champion

References

External links 
 
Pride of St. James Marching band website
School Newspaper

Public high schools in South Carolina
Schools in Horry County, South Carolina